Super League of Malawi, also known as the TNM Super League for sponsorship reasons, is the top football division in Malawi. Contested by 16 clubs, it operates on a system of promotion and relegation with the Malawi Regional Football Leagues.

Malawian mobile telecommunications company TNM sponsors the league with K65 million annually.

History
It was created in 1986 and was first sponsored by Gillet Nacet. It was composed of eight teams: five teams from Blantyre and Districts Football League (BDFL) and three teams from Lilongwe and Districts Football League (LDFL). The eight inaugural members of the Super League of Malawi were Bata Bullets, Limbe Leaf Wanderers, MDC United, Red Lions, ADMARC Tigers, Silver Strikers, Civo United and MITCO.

Competition format
There are 16 clubs in the Super League. During the course of a season (from April to December) each club plays the others twice (a double round-robin system), once at their home stadium and once at that of their opponents', for 30 games. The first place teams qualifies for the Confederation of African Football (CAF) Champions League or  Confederation Cup and the three lowest placed teams in the Super League are relegated to the regional leagues. The winners of each regional league (Southern Region Football League, Central Region Football League and Northern Region Football League) promoted to the Super League.

International competitions

Qualification for African competitions

Qualification criteria for 2021–22 
Association ranking for 2022–23 CAF Champions League and 2022–23 CAF Confederation Cup will be based on results from each CAF tournament (Champions League and Confederation Cup) from 2018 to 2020–21.

The winner of the Super League qualify for the subsequent season's CAF Champions League.

Current clubs
The following sixteen clubs are competing in the Super League of Malawi during the 2022 season.

Previous winners

Performance by club

Top scorers

References

External links
Official Website
League at fifa.com
RSSSF competition history

 
Football competitions in Malawi
Malawi